In computing, a status key is a keyboard key that causes an operating system and/or a program to output status information on a terminal when it is pressed.  In the event that a program on a terminal produces no indications that it is running, typing the status key will reveal the program's state and activity.  Older implementations produced only a quick one-line status report for the current job when the status key was pressed. Newer implementations support sending a signal to the current process to allow the application to report on status as well.

Implementations 

Several different operating systems have a status key feature.

DEC RSTS/E 

RSTS/E is documented as having a status key at least as far back as 1977 and it continued to have one into at least the 1980s. Typing the status key results in output that is represented by the following example:

 18   GARP::KB32   SYSTAT+BAS4F     ^C(0R)   11(16)K+ 16K  3.3(+5)

DEC TOPS-10 

On TOPS-10 when the CTRL/T (control-T) key is pressed, the monitor prints status information pertaining to the job on the terminal.  Typing CTRL/T displays a job's progress without interrupting its execution.  No representation of a control-t character is displayed on the terminal, just the status information.

 DAY: :05:43 RUN:0.48 RD:75 WR:8 SOS 12+19p ^C Ctx:1 PC:400275

Incremental values in the table below indicate that the value is the accumulation since login or last CTRL/T whichever was shortest.

DEC TOPS-20 

TOPS-20 reports a shorter list of information than its predecessors:

 09:36:35 TEST Running at 404157 Used 0:00:35.8 in 0:30:39, Load 4.04

MIT ITS 

ITS copied the idea from TOPS-20, but used the key sequence  .

 19:29:10 3 RMS    HACTRN EMACS1 130566

VSI OpenVMS 

OpenVMS has a status key which can be customized and works with remote processes.  The default output includes these items:

 NODE22::SMITH  16:21:04 (DCL) CPU=00:03:29.39 PF=14802 IO=18652 MEM=68

BSD UNIX 

4.3BSD-Reno and BSD systems derived from that version and OSF/1 have a status key which defaults to Ctrl-T and can be assigned to any key.  It sends SIGINFO to the current process which is ignored by default but can be configured to call a function which can display status information from the program.

 load: 0.10  cmd: sleep 1594 [nanslp] 1.33r 0.00u 0.00s 0% 1864k

Apple macOS 
Because XNU has a FreeBSD kernel which has been modified to be a Mach server process, the terminal driver includes a status key which is inherited.

 load: 3.04 cmd: sleep 719 waiting 0.00u 0.00s

References 

Computer keys
System monitors